Aethiothemis is a small genus of dragonflies in the family Libellulidae.

Species include:
Aethiothemis basilewskyi 
Aethiothemis bella 
Aethiothemis bequaerti 
Aethiothemis carpenteri 
Aethiothemis diamangae 
Aethiothemis discrepans  – southern gorgeous skimmer
Aethiothemis mediofasciata  – orange flasher
Aethiothemis palustris 
Aethiothemis solitaria

References

Libellulidae
Anisoptera genera
Taxonomy articles created by Polbot